Gıyaseddin Keyhüsrev was the name of three Anatolian Seljuk Sultans.

 Gıyaseddin Keyhüsrev I - reigned during two different periods, the first time between 1192 and 1196, the second time between 1205 and 1211
 Gıyaseddin Keyhüsrev II - reigned between 1237 and 1246
 Gıyaseddin Keyhüsrev III - reigned between 1265 and 1282